The 2001–02 season was FC Dinamo București's 53rd season in Divizia A. In this season, Dinamo became Romanian champions for the 16th time in history. Dinamo was eliminated quickly from the UEFA Cup, and concentrated only on the internal competition. Thus, after the first half of the season, Dinamo was leader with two points over the revelation FC Național. In March 2002, Dinamo defeated Rapid 3–2, and distanced itself to five points at the front of the standings, and Cristian Borcea, Dinamo's president, launched after the game the famous sentence: "Let us prepare for the Champions League"

Finally, Dinamo won the title in the last round of games, with a win against FC Braşov, and at the same time a defeat for FC Naţional, leader before that round, at Universitatea Craiova.

In the Romanian Cup, Dinamo was defeated in the final by Rapid.

Results

UEFA Cup 
Qualifying round

FC Dinamo won 4–1 on aggregate

First round

Grasshoppers won 6–2 on aggregate

Squad 
Goalkeepers: Bogdan Lobonț (22 / 0); Florin Prunea (6 / 0); Alexandru Iliuciuc (2 / 0).
Defenders: Mugur Bolohan (26 / 5); Adrian Iordache (1 / 0); Sorin Iodi (11 / 0); Giani Kiriță (28 / 2); Valentin Năstase (13 / 2); Bogdan Onuț (27 / 2); Iosif Tâlvan (26 / 0); Marian Vătavu (11 / 0); Dorin Semeghin (13 / 1); Cristian Pulhac (1 / 0).
Midfielders:  Romulus Buia (9 / 0); Constantin Ilie (10 / 0); Ioan Lupescu (7 / 0); Vlad Munteanu (19 / 5); Florin Pârvu (20 / 1); Răzvan Pădurețu (1 / 0); Florentin Petre (10 / 1); Cătălin Rață (1 / 0); Ovidiu Stîngă (18 / 0); Iulian Tameș (29 / 6); Ianis Zicu (16 / 2).
Forwards: Bogdan Aldea (1 / 0); Alexandru Bălțoi (4 / 0); Ionel Dănciulescu (13 / 3); Claudiu Drăgan (23 / 4); Sabin Ilie (7 / 3); Adrian Mihalcea (14 / 11); Claudiu Niculescu (28 / 15); Ciprian Marica (2 / 0).
(league appearances and goals listed in brackets)

Manager: Marin Ion / Cornel Dinu.

Transfers 
New players: Claudiu Niculescu(U.Craiova), Ovidiu Stângă (PSV Eindhoven), Bogdan Lobonţ (Ajax Amsterdam), Ionel Dănciulescu (Steaua), Ionuţ Ilie (Ceahlăul)

Left team: Vali Năstase, Mihalcea (Genoa), Buia (Gloria Bistriţa), Lupescu (Al Hilal Riyadh), Semeghin (Petrolul), Sabin Ilie (FC Naţional).

References

External links 
 www.labtof.ro
 Romaniansoccer.ro
 Worldfootball.net

FC Dinamo București seasons
Dinamo Bucuresti
Romanian football championship-winning seasons